Saga Musical Instruments is a manufacturer and wholesale distributor of stringed instruments, particularly fretted instruments and members of the violin family, and parts and accessories for them. They own twenty-two brands, fifteen are listed below.

Brands
Their brands include:
 Blueridge
 Gitane
 Appalachian
 J Navarro
 Rover
 Kentucky
 Anton Brenton
 Hamano
 Regal
 Durango
 Trinity College
 Gold Star
 Cremona
 H. Siegler
 Hamano
 Diamond Head
 Recital Instruments

Blueridge
The Blueridge brand are Chinese-built and have won praise from publications such as Guitarist Magazine, Total Guitar and Music Maker for quality and affordability. The company specializes in historic and pre-war reproductions that are used by folk and bluegrass players. Endorsed by UK bluesman Martin Harley, two Blueridge models were used to break the world record for the highest gig ever played.
Played by Melvin Goins, Ralph Stanley II, Larry Sparks and many more.

Families of instruments
 Guitar family brands include: Accent, Blueridge, Bristol, Burns, Catala, Cigano, J. Navarro, P. Saez, & Regal 
 Mandolin family brands include: Appalachian,  Kentucky, Rover, & Trinity College.
 Banjo family brands include: Appalachian, Flinthill, Gold Star, Rover, & Saga.
 Violin family brands include: Anton Breton, Appalachian, Cervina, Cremona, & Recital Instruments
 Ukulele family brands include: Hamano, & Diamond Head
 Folk instrument brands include: Appalachian, Cusco, Schwartz, & Trinity College

References

External links
 Company homepage.
 Blueridge Guitars on Fretbase Specs, photos and videos of Blueridge models

Musical instrument manufacturing companies of the United States
String instrument manufacturing companies